Jack Tait may refer to:

John Tait (athlete) (John Lindsay "Jack" Tait), Canadian athlete
John Guthrie Tait (John "Jack" Guthrie Tait), Scottish educator

See also
Jack Tate (disambiguation)
John Tait (disambiguation)